Fox River Trail could refer to two different recreational trails in the United States:

 Fox River Trail (Illinois), in Kane County, Illinois
 Fox River State Recreational Trail, in Brown County, Wisconsin